Eupithecia cuneata is a moth in the family Geometridae. It is found in China (Yunnan), Myanmar and Thailand.

The wingspan is about 17–18 mm. The forewings are pale reddish brown and the hindwings are dirt white.

References

Moths described in 1984
cuneata
Moths of Asia